Acanthostichus arizonensis is a species of ant belonging to the genus Acanthostichus. It was described by Mackay in 1996. These ants are distributed in the United States and Mexico.

References

External links

Dorylinae
Insects of Mexico
Insects of the United States
Hymenoptera of North America
Fauna of the Southwestern United States
Insects described in 1996